Daniele Gaudi (born 12 July 1963), better known simply as Gaudi, is an Anglo-Italian musician, solo artist and record producer based in London who specialises in dub music, electronica, reggae and worldbeat. Gaudi's distinctive production sound appears in a number of name acts' albums nominated for Awards and prizes such as: Grammy Award 2019 -Best Reggae Album Of The Year- for Mass Manipulation by Steel Pulse and BBC Radio 3 Awards for World Music 2008 for the album Dub Qawwali by Gaudi & Nusrat Fateh Ali Khan. His music works and contributions have topped international charts such as: Billboard Reggae Chart no.1 with the album Heavy Rain by Lee "Scratch" Perry, Billboard Reggae Chart no.1 with the album Mass Manipulation by Steel Pulse, Billboard Reggae Chart no.1 with the album Vessel of Love by Hollie Cook, Billboard Reggae Chart no.2 with "Rainford" by Lee "Scratch" Perry, UK Dance Chart no.1 with of "Jus' Come (Terra Terra Remix by Cool Jack)".

Productions
In his career, Gaudi has produced, composed for, remixed and worked with: The Orb, Lee "Scratch" Perry, Groove Armada, Nusrat Fateh Ali Khan, Deep Forest, Simple Minds, Steel Pulse, Lamb, Scientist, Hollie Cook, Pete Namlook, Horace Andy, Bryan Ferry, Halsey (singer), Dreadzone, Johnny Clarke, Bob Marley, The Beat, Sizzla, Trentemoller, Mad Professor, Adamski, Capleton, Maxi Priest, Terry Hall of The Specials, Shpongle, Desmond Dekker, Michael Rose, Elisa, Bill Laswell, Adrian Sherwood, Grandmaster Flash ft. KRS-One, Michael Franti, Dennis Bovell, Don Letts, African Head Charge, Jovanotti, Patty Pravo, Martin "Youth" Glover, Max Romeo, Almamegretta, Soom T, Cast, Afrika Bambaataa, Caparezza, General Levy, Apache Indian,  Piero Pelù, Dubmatix, 1 Giant Leap ft Michael Stipe (of R.E.M) and Asha Bhosle, Mansun, Creation Rebel, Zion Train ft Tippa Irie, Irene Grandi, Righeira, EMF, Rocky Dawuni, Megative ft Mick Jones (of The Clash), Lion D., Peter Andre, Beats Antique, Dub FX, Eraldo Bernocchi, Dub Pistols, Artful Dodger, Disciplinatha, Morgan (singer), Big Audio Dynamite, Colin Edwin (of Porcupine Tree), Natacha Atlas, Balkan Beat Box, The Elovaters, Isola Posse All Stars, Banco de Gaia, Marty Dread, Ornella Vanoni & Delta-V (musical group), Ojos de Brujo, The String Cheese Incident, Lina Sastri, The Gang, Sounds from the Ground, t.A.T.u, The Orb ft. David Gilmour, Donatella Rettore, Jim Kerr (of Simple Minds), Mondo Marcio, Carbon Based Lifeforms, Suns of Arqa, Earl 16, Awa Fall, Francesco Baccini, Hang Massive, N.O.I.A, Kinobe, Mazzy Star, Ink Project, Ricky Gianco, Scissor Sisters, Kuba, The Bastard Sons Of Dioniso, Kaya Project, Marty Dread, Aram Quartet, Tony Esposito, Dusted, Karen Ramirez, Raiz, Jestofunk ft. Jocelyn Brown, Tripswitch, Dream Machine, Rebbie Jackson, Trilok Gurtu.     
                     
Despite the majority of his production work takes place at his Metatron Studio in London, he is a busy live performer and spends a large proportion of his time touring – performing to theaters, clubs and festival audiences around the world. His career started in the early 1980s, his musical foundations were set in electronic music, post-punk and reggae.

Biography

Early career (Italy 1981–1995)
Gaudi's career started in 1981 in his native country Italy as a keyboard player for new-wave bands such as: Wild Planet, Red Light and Violet Eves, the latter band playing an important role in the Italian underground music scene combining electronica, post-punk and traditional Italian melodies. A few years later he joined the reggae band Bamboo Company which whom spent 5 years and developed his skills as a reggae music producer.

In the mid-1980s, Gaudi started to gain recognition in the underground music scene for his studio works as a keyboardist with bands such as: The Gang -on the album 'Barricada', 1985- and Disciplinatha -on the album Abbiamo pazientato 40 anni, ora basta, 1987-.

With three members of the Bamboo Company, Gaudi founded Raptus, one of the first Hip Hop act using Italian lyrics, releasing the 12in single "Peggio della colla" in 1986 on Multimedia Attack Punk Records and being subsequently spotted by Italian rocker Vasco Rossi and his production team Terryball which produced their next single. While expectations for the project were high, unfortunately exposure was low and the band split.

In 1987, Gaudi began his first solo project as a solo singer with the name Lele Gaudi, creating what was to become the first 'Raggamuffin' album written in Italian. In 1988 the album was finished however record companies were uneasy with the concept of an untried formula and unwilling to take the risk of releasing it. Gaudi spent the next 2 years meeting record labels to find an appropriate deal. During this period he also spent time in Jamaica, testing his project and getting valuable feedbacks for the quality of his work.

With producers Ricky Rinaldi aka Ohm Guru and Frank Nemola, Gaudi founded Tubi Forti, a production team soon to become fairly established in the indie circuit for their works with: Isola Posse All Stars -for their 12in single 'Stop al panico'-, Sud Sound System, -for their 12in single 'Fuecu'-, Donatella Rettore -for her single 'Zan Zan Zan' and more. With this production team, Gaudi also released a number of 12in singles on Irma Records as: National Rare Groove (singles 'Lets Dance' and 'Talking To You'), Dr Muff & Crazy Stuff (single 'Don't Forget This'), 4t Thieves (single ‘Etnotechno’), the latter being Gaudi's first experiment with world music fused with electronica.

Two years on from the initial knock-backs, Gaudi signed his first major record deal with Polygram/Universal for his solo project as Lele Gaudi, he flew to London for the recording of his first 12in single 'Maliniconico Love' featuring Crucial Robbie, recorded at Jah Tubby's Studio. The single's official videoclip gained major exposure and heavy rotation on MTV resulting in an immediate success in Italy.

Gaudi's debut album Basta Poco was released in 1991 followed by a solid exposure by the medias and participation to numerous TV shows on the Italian national TV RAI, culminated with the winning of his first award by RAI as "Best Italian New Coming Act 1991".

His second 12" single '1990 Anni Fa' was released later in the year by Polygram/Mercury Records and was promptly banned from Vatican City due to its 'sensitive content', needless to say this did nothing to harm record sales.

For the 2 years tour that followed the success of the album, Gaudi was backed by reggae band WDX.

In 1993, Gaudi added his signature to a collaboration with socially conscious Italian singer Ricky Gianco, an artist well known for his upfront social commentary. The exposure gained from this project firmly established Gaudi as a household name.

The same year he collaborated with Francesco Baccini for a raggamuffin vocal part on his single 'Lei sta con te', produced by Glezos.

Pulling together previous music influences, Gaudi started experimenting with a new music instrument, the Theremin, combining its ethereal electronic sound with dub and psychedelic music, resulting with the release of a number of 12in singles under the moniker Dub Alchemist.

Career in London, 1995–present

In 1995 Gaudi moved to London and set up 'Metatron Studio London', founded the record label 'Sub Signal' and the production team “Terra Terra” in partnership with DJ Angelino. The duo produced several remixes including their 1996 No.1 UK dance chart 'Jus come' by Cool Jack, released on AM:PM Records.

Gaudi then signed with Harmony Management and established his career as a remixer, working for named pop acts such as: Mansun for their single 'Taxloss' which at no.14 in the UK, Mazzy Star for their single 'Roseblood', Cast for their track 'History' which charted at no.2 in the UK, Peter Andre for his single 'AllAbout Us' which charted at no.3 in the UK, then Africa Bambaataa, Rebbie Jackson, Jeanie Tracy, Love City, L.A Believers, Kinobe, New Clear Family and more. 

The first Gaudi's full-length studio album entirely produced in his studio in London was Sound of Anatomy, an ambient concept album released under the moniker Ultraviolet Zero, in collaboration with multi-instrumentalist Pauli Atzei. 
in the following two years Gaudi composed music for BBC, Channel 4, RAI, ITV and many soundtracks and jingles for MTV. It was for MTV that Gaudi composed the music for the Europe Music Awards 1998, becoming then a popular anthem, resulting with the release of the 12in single Cadillac Kitsch, with the moniker Mad Master Moog. Followed by popularity of his composition in relation with TV shows, Gaudi started to create music also for commercials, such as: Sony PlayStation, Longines, Fiat, Seat, Energie, Fiorucci and The Express.

In 1998 he wrote the song "Non ti Scrivero" for Italian popstar Irene Grandi, featured on her double platinum selling album Per Fortuna Purtroppo.

Still in the same year, Gaudi's third album Earthbound was released on a triple vinyl by Bustin Loose Recordings, giving him worldwide sales recognition and a solid exposure that led to his tracks appearing on numerous compilations.
Earthbound contains music influences ranging from Indian ragas to African chanting and from Jamaican chatting to Italian traditional melodies, its one unifying factor being the flavors of reggae and dub.
The album featured 39 musicians from around the globe, including Jamaican raggamuffin star General Levy, Indian singers Kiren Sambhi and Sonal Varsani, Sardinian voice virtuosos Tenores di Neoneli, Trio Cocco and Antonio Testa who provided the track Stalagmite, recorded in a cave playing natural stalagmites.
The dub version of Earthbound, titled ‘Earthbound in Dub’ was also released later that year on Sub Signal.
In 2000, Gaudi took a trip to Africa and spent some time in Burkina Faso experiencing the lifestyle and culture of the indigenous communities, there he recorded a number of African musicians for his next album, Bass, Sweat & Tears.
Year 2000 also saw the beginning of the four years collaboration with world-music exponent DJ Pathaan, the duo named themselves 'Orchestral World Groove' and got residencies at prestigious London venues such as Cargo, Fabric, Dogstar, Plan B and Redstar. The duo released tracks on many compilations worldwide and toured internationally, performing at high-profile venues and festivals such as Roskilde in Denmark, Skol Beat in Brazil, The Big Chill and Gatecrasher in England.

2003 started with Gaudi remixing the song 'Soul Shakedown Party' by Reggae icon Bob Marley, followed by 'The man who sold the world' by Simple Minds (song written by David Bowie) and subsequently working on Jim Kerr's single Innerworld, released with the moniker ‘Pascal Life’.

With classical composer Massimo Nunzi, in 2004 Gaudi composed a symphonic/jazz interpretation of Shakespeare's The Tempest for a 20 piece orchestra infused with live electronic dub elements and Theremin played by himself. Major exponents of the European jazz scene such as Gianluigi Trovesi, Mederic Collignon, Gianluca Petrella, Paolo Damiani, Ada Montellanico and Italian pop singer Niccolo Fabi were part of the project which culminated with two high-profile concerts at Roccella Jonica Jazz Festival and at the Villa Borghese in Rome.

In the same year Gaudi teamed-up with French inventor/engineer Michel Moglia and his music instrument The Fire Organ (Orgue A Feu), a 20-ton metal pipe structure that works with fire. The duo composed ‘Elemental’, an opera for Fire Organ and Theremin which resulted in a spectacular double performance at the Colosseum in Rome to an international audience of more than 350,000.

Gaudi's 5th solo album Bass, Sweat & Tears, was released in 2004 by Canadian label Interchill Records and gained an immediate success becoming the label's best selling release to date.[3]. Considered by the press "ground-breaking and influential" the album reached notable sales recognitions and charted at #2 in the iTunes European chart and at #32 in the iTunes USA chart. Songs from it were featured in over 70 compilations and licensed for movies such as: Pooja Bhatt's Bollywood films noir Rog and Fareb by Vikram Bhatt, while the track 'Chant Thermique' featured on the film 'Let It Ride' (about the life of legendary snowboarder Craig Kelly) won the Award as "Best Soundtrack".

The following year, Gaudi wrote the hit singles 'Lasciala Andare' and 'Lady Picche', for Italian singer Irene Grandi included in her platinum-selling album Indelebile (WEA). Lasciala Andare topped the Italian chart at #2 and stayed for 16 consecutive weeks. The song was subsequently included in the platinum sales album collection 'Irene Grandi - Hits (Atlantic 2007)' and the double live album Lasciami Andare. The success of the song continued for several years and expanded also into the Greek market, with Eleonora Zouganeli covering it in Greek language (renaming it "Fevgo gia mena mia fora") and topping the Greek charts for several weeks.

Later in the year, Gaudi teamed up with sound-therapist Antonio Testa and composed the concept album GAUDI:TESTA 1105 (also known as CONTINUUM), released by UK label Em:t Records. The album reached #3 in the iTunes European Electronic chart.

In 2006, ambient music pioneer Pete Namlook invited Gaudi to his studio Klanglabor Hodeshof in Germany to compose the collaborative album Re:sonate, released then on Fax Records. The album combines Namlook's trademark lengthy meandering structures and spacey pads with Gaudi's dub expertise and unique ‘home-grown’ sounds.

In the same year he co-wrote and played Melodica, Theremin and Moog on the track 'Palmprint' by British electro-dub duo Sounds From The Ground, included in their album High Rising. 
He produced and co-wrote the debut solo album by dub-electronica artist Ashtech, Walkin' Target, featuring ragga vocalist Cheshire Cat from the electronic duo Leftfield and released the compilation Sub Signals Vol.1 on Interchill Records in collaboration with his label Sub Signal

In 2007 Gaudi did his first studio work for Jamaican dub pioneer Lee "Scratch" Perry (the first of a series of 5), at Livingston Studio in London, alongside producers Dennis Bovell and Charly Redseal. He created new drum parts for the remake of 3 iconic Bob Marley's songs written by Perry 30 years before: Kaya, Sun Is Shining and Punky Reggae Party.

In the same year he worked with Jamaican singer Horace Andy on the track Just Say Who, included in the album Vulgus by reggae band Almamegretta, followed by a Gaudi remix of the same song.

The album Dub Qawwali featuring 'Pakistan's premier ambassador of Qawwali music' Nusrat Fateh Ali Khan was released worldwide in August 2007 by Six Degrees Records, receiving massive critical acclaim, reaching no.2 in the iTunes US Chart, no.4 in the UK and was the no.1 seller in Amazon.com's Electronic Music section. It also earned Gaudi a nomination for the BBC's World Music Awards 2008.

2008 started with a studio work with hip hop pioneer Grandmaster Flash, playing the Theremin and Moog on the track 'What if' featuring KRS-One. 
In the same year he took on the role of vocal coach for the TV show The X Factor;, emerged victorious with the vocal group he was coaching, Aram Quartet, winning the show.

The following year started with a return to XFactor for the second series and once again to coach the groups category. It was another successful series with the group he was coaching 'The Bastard Sons of Dioniso', winning the critic's award with their track L'amor Carnale (co-wrote and produced by Gaudi), reaching then the no.1 in the Italian charts. Their debut EP with the same name 'L'amor Carnale' (also produced by Gaudi) won the Gold Disc. Subsequently, Gaudi also produced their debut album In Stasi Perpetua, released by Sony Music in November 2009. 
The following year Gaudi worked on his 3rd and last series of X Factor, coaching the female vocal trio Yavanna and reaching the 3rd place.

Gaudi's 12th solo album, No Prisoners, featuring Michael Franti, Dub Gabriel, Elisa, Dr. Israel, was released in March 2010 by Six Degrees Records. 

2011 began with the ongoing collaboration with UK electronica pioneers The Orb, for the creation of their project SCREEN, with Alex Paterson on samplers, Gaudi on the production and synths and musical maverick Chester Taylor on vocals. SCREEN's debut album We are Screen! was released worldwide by UK label Malicious Damage.
More Gaudi remixes saw the light the same year, working on tracks from: Lamb, Trentemøller, Delhi 2 dublin, Ganga Giri, Animation, Kaya Project, HFB, Desmond Dekker, The Upsetters, Adriano K, Noia and the chart-topping collaboration between The Orb and Pink Floyd guitarist David Gilmour Metallic Spheres.

In 2012 Gaudi released the double CD compilation Everlasting on Iboga Records featuring Mad Professor, The Orb, Lamb, Trentemøller, System 7, Pete Namlook, Tipper, Eat Static, Pitch Black, Alan Parsons and Shpongle.

A tight schedule of music works kept Gaudi busy in the recording studio throughout 2012, spending a few months in California for the production of the album Wake the Lion by American reggae band Indubious, working with Adamski on their collaborative track "Pawa 2 da ppl", remixing a dozen of international pop acts and starting the foundation of his album In Between Times.

A lengthy 2012 tour of the US, Canada, Europe, India and Australia ended in December with a memorable concert at The Pyramids of Giza (Giza Necropolis) in Egypt.

Gaudi's album In Between Times featuring Michael Rose (Black Uhuru front man), Lee Scratch Perry, Twilight Circus, The Orb, Danny Ladwa, Dennis Bovell, Raja Ram from Shpongle, Deadly Hunta, Jahmai and author and philosopher Gregory Sams was released in May 2013 by Six Degrees Records.
The recognition of Gaudi's role as a vocal coach for XFactor's 3 series, led him to return to the Italian national television RAI2, this time for the talent show The Voice, working for two series with singer Piero Pelu' from the band Litfiba, with whom also co-wrote the top-chart single Mille Uragani, included on Pelu's album Identikit (Sony Music).

Many studio collaborations, remixes and productions were released between 2013 and 2015, with Gaudi adding his signature trademark on acts such as: Deep Forest, Banco de Gaia, Dub FX, Sizzla, The Orb, N.O.I.A, Natacha Atlas, David Starfire, Beats Antique, Dub Pistols, Suns Of Arqa, Hang Massive, The Beat, Danny Ladwa, Tsuyoshi Suzuki, Asian Dub Foundation, Captain Hook, Almamegretta, Loungedelic, Caparezza and Michael Franti.

To celebrate the 10th anniversary release of Gaudi's album Bass, Sweat & Tears, in 2014 the label Six Degrees Records released a new dub album titled Dub, Sweat & Tears, containing dub versions produced by Gaudi. Later in the same year, the album In Between Times - Remixed was released, a remix album featuring: Zion Train, Banco de Gaia, Deep Forest, Tsuyoshi Suzuki, Perfect Stranger, Desert Dwellers, David Starfire, Dub Pistols, Kaya Project and Alexart.

In the following two years, Gaudi produced, remixed, composed and released albums with/for: Hollie Cook, Carbon Based Lifeforms, Soom T, Barrington Levy, Tripswitch, Beats Antique, Deep Forest and Martin "Youth" Glover. 
It is with music producer (and Killing Joke's bassist) Youth that Gaudi teamed up for the next few projects, including the green vinyl EP 2063: A Dub Odyssey (released with Youth under the name Youth & Gaudi), the albums Vessel of Love by Hollie Cook and No Sounds Are Out of Bounds by The Orb, on which Gaudi also appeared as keyboardist and songwriter.

After having signed a record deal with experimental UK record label Rarenoise Records, Gaudi released a white vinyl EP containing the songs 'Electronic Impromptu in E-flat Minor' and '30 Hz Dub Prelude', featuring Bill Laswell on bass, Colin Edwin (of Porcupine Tree) on bass, Steve Jansen (of art-pop band Japan) on drum, Eraldo Bernocchi on guitar, Roger Eno on piano, Ted Parsons (of Killing Joke) on drum, Masami Akita on electronics, Lorenzo Feliciati on bass, Coppe' on vocals e Alessandro Gwis.

Gaudi's album Magnetic was released in 2017 by Rarenoise Records, followed by the collaborative albums Epic Circuit with Grammy Award-winner Deep Forest and Astronaut Alchemists with Youth.

In 2018 Pink Floyd's saxophonist Scott Page and vocalist Roberta Freeman involved Gaudi as a theremin and synthesisers player as part of their supergroup with Stephen Perkins (from Jane's Addiction) on drum, L. Shankar on violin, Norwood Fisher (from Fishbone) on bass, Kenny Olson (from Kid Rock) on guitar, Jon Stankorb on guitar and voice, Eric Mayron (from Dr. Dre) on keyboards. 
The supergroup played sold-out shows in Los Angeles, USA and Hungaria, performing live new arrangements of Pink Floyd's classics with the addition of new music pieces composed by Gaudi and spectacular 360 live visuals by Android Jones.
In the same year he worked with Russian Soprano singer Maria Matveeva and remixed the song Kalinushka, written with Deep Forest, part of her project 'Siberian Tales' which subsequently brought her to wim the Russian World Music Awards 2020.

In 2019, he produced songs and dub versions for Steel Pulse's album Mass Manipulation, which charted at #1 on Billboard and received a nomination for the Grammy Award for Best Reggae Album, played the piano on Horace Andy's song 'Mr. Bassie', played keyboards and synthesizers on the albums Heavy Rain and Rainford by Lee Scratch Perry produced by Adrian Sherwood, which charted at no.1 and no.2 on Billboard respectively. 
2019 also saw the release of the collaborative album Mad Professor meets Gaudi, featuring Macka B, Steel Pulse, Michael Rose and Marty Dread, and the EP Ennio Morricone in Dub - the Good, the Dub and the Ugly, released under the name LAB DUB, a production duo consisting of Gaudi and Hardage.  
The same year Gaudi remixed Rocky Dawuni, Mista Savona's Havana Meets Kingston, MIDIval Punditz, Dub FX, Tiki Taane from Salmonella Dub, The Elovaters and Bluetech.

The Orb's 2020 albums Abolition of the Royal Familia and the remix album Abolition of the Royal Familia in Dub featured Gaudi on keyboards, theremin, melodica and songwriting on 10 tracks. 
UK label Liquid Sound design released the Youth & Gaudi album Astronaut Alchemists Remixes, written and produced by Youth and Gaudi, featuring remixes by The Orb, Bombay Dub Orchestra, The Egg, Banco de Gaia, Pitch Black, Gus Till, Vlastur, Kaya Project, Jef Stott, Deep Fried Dub and Gabriel Le Mar.
To celebrate 100 years of the Theremin, invented in 1920, Gaudi has created the album 100 Years of Theremin (The Dub Chapter), an album of Theremin infused with dub and reggae. In this opus, he teamed up with dub producers Mad Professor, Adrian Sherwood, Scientist, Dennis Bovell and Prince Fatty whom have provided the riddims that underpin Gaudi's Theremin playing on this album project.
The album came out on August 7, 2020, and has been an immediate success, selling out 4 vinyl pressings and has gaining worldwide critical acclaim. The album has been voted #28 in Electronic Sound Magazine's 2020 "Album Of The Year" and #1 in Black Rhino Magazine "Best Album of 2020".
In November 2020 Dubmission Records follows up Gaudi critically acclaimed album, with the 7" vinyl "Theremin in Hand / Theremin Memoir", featuring Colin Edwin on bass, while Horseman and Sly Dunbar are on drums.
December 2020 sees the release of Shanti Powa's new single 'Rainy day', produced by Gaudi.
The year ends with TWGEEMA (The World's Greatest Ever Electronic Music Albums) including 4 albums with Gaudi works in the chart: 100 Years of Theremin (The Dub Chapter), The Orb Abolition of the Royal Familia, Youth & Gaudi Astronaut Alchemists (Remixes) and The Orb Auntie Aubrey's Excursions Beyond the Call of Duty Pt.3'. 
in 2021 Gaudi teamed-up with UK band Dub Pistols and Canadian producer Dubmatix for the creation of their single 'Blue Monday' (a cover version of the iconic New Order song), which charted at #1 on the iTunes Reggae chart and at #1 on Beatport.
Fifteen new remixes carrying Gaudi's signature were released in 2021: The Orb, Groove Armada, Steel Pulse, Righeira, Big Audio Dynamite, Lion D ft Capleton, Jovanotti, Jossie Telch, Zoe Devlin, Indubious, Ace Ventura & Astrix, Maxi Priest & Hardage, Terra Nine, Ink Project, Ras Tewelde ft Sizzla, he also played keyboards on the remix 'I am not a woman, I'm a God (On-U Sound)' by American multimillion selling artist Halsey (singer), song produced by Trent Reznor of Nine Inch Nails and remixed by Adrian Sherwood.
He produced Shanti Powa's full-length album Dreamer, released the collaborative album Future Relic with Kiwi electronic producer Grouch (Iboga Records) and released the new single "Dropping the Pressure" as YOUTH & GAUDI.
He produced a remix of the track E=MC2 by Big Audio Dynamite included in the compilation series Late Night Tales, appearing as Gaudi feat Don Letts and Emily Capell.
In 2022 Gaudi was featured on the albums Midnight Rocker and Midnight Scorcher by Horace Andy as keyboards and piano player, backing-vocalist and songwriter. The former album reached the no.41 in the official UK chart. He co-wrote and produced the songs 'Step' and 'Don't Stand For Dis' by reggae singer Soom T included on her album Good, he wrote the track 'Boundary' with Dreadzone featuring Earl 16 and engineered the track 'Sightsee MC' feat Don Letts and Soom T, both tracks included in the double album Dubwiser Vol.2, which reached the no.13 in the UK official vinyl chart.  
15 years after the release of the compilation Sub Signals Vol.1, Gaudi released the Sub Signals Vol.2 on Dubmission Records, feat Groove Armada, The Orb, African Head Charge, Adrian Sherwood, Dennis Bovell, Steel Pulse and Dub FX.
The second collaborative album as Youth & Gaudi titled Stratosphere was released in 2022, followed by the EP Gaudi: Theremin Tribute to The Smiths-on which Gaudi is on the production and plays the Theremin-, the single 'Outta Sync' by Don Letts and 'Positive In Dub' by Havana Meets Kingston, both produced and co-written by Gaudi. With Don Letts he wrote and produced Jamaican star Johnny Clarke's single 'Rise Reggae People', remixed EMF's 90s anthem 'Unbelievable' and Venezuelan band Un, Dos, Tres y Fuera, then remixed Brian Ferry, Savana Funk, Eccodek, Bukkha, Living Light, Dennis Bovell and Arianne Schreiber. The year ended with the release of 'Havana Meets Kingston In Dub', a collaborative album with Australian producer Mista Savona, featuring Sly & Robbie, Cornel Campbell, Prince Alla, Ernest Ranglin, Leroy Sibbles of The Heptones, Buena Vista Social Club, Lutan Fyah, Randy Valentine, Aza Lineage, Los Van Van and Bongo Herman.

Bands and monikers
 Screen (Gaudi & The Orb)
 Dub Alchemist
 Drums Of Defiance (Gaudi & African Head Charge's Bonjo)
 Mad Professor & Gaudi
 Paranoise
 Lele Gaudi’
 Gaudi & Grouch
 National Rare Groove (NRG)
 4T Thieves
 Deep Forest & Gaudi
 Lab Dub
 Gaudi & Savona
 Youth & Gaudi
 Dr Muff & Crazy Stuff
 Gaudi & Savona
 Mad Master Moog
 Ultraviolet Zero
 Weirdub
 Groovekilla
 Youth & Gaudi
 Raptus
 Terra Terra
 Orchestral World Groove

Discography
Albums
 GAUDI & SAVONA Havana Meets Kingston In Dub (VP Records 2022)
 YOUTH & GAUDI Stratosphere (Liquid Sound Design 2022)
 GAUDI Sub Signals Vol.2 various artists compilation (Dubmission Records 2022)
 GAUDI & GROUCH Future Relic (Iboga Records 2021)
 GAUDI 100 Years Of Theremin (The Dub Chapter) (Dubmission Records 2020)
 YOUTH & GAUDI Astronaut Alchemists Remixes (Liquid Sound Design 2020)
 MAD PROFESSOR MEETS GAUDI (Ariwa Sound 2019)
 YOUTH & GAUDI Astronaut Alchemists (Liquid Sound Design 2018)
 DEEP FOREST & GAUDI Epic Circuits (EMM 2018)
 GAUDI Magnetic (Rarenoise Records 2017)
 GAUDI In Between Times (The Remixes) (Six Degrees Records 2015)
 GAUDI Dub, Sweat & Tears (Six Degrees Records 2014)
 GAUDI In between times (Six Degrees Records 2013)
 SCREEN We are Screen! (Malicious Damage 2012)
 GAUDI No Prisoners (Six Degrees Records 2010)
 GAUDI + NUSRAT FATEH ALI KHAN Dub Qawwali (Six Degrees Records 2007)
 GAUDI Sub Signals Vol.1 various artists compilation (Interchill 2007)
 GAUDI & PETE NAMLOOK Re:sonate (Fax Records 2006)
 GAUDI:TESTA 1105 Continvvm (Em:t Records 2005)
 GAUDI Bass, Sweat & Tears (Interchill 2004)
 GAUDI & KEITA My Beautiful Laundrette (Sub Signal 2002)
 WEIRDUB Recreational (Sub Signal 2002)
 GAUDI Earthbound in Dub (Sub Signal 2000)
 GAUDI Earthbound (Bustin'Loose/Antenna 1999)
 ULTRAVIOLET ZERO Sound of Anatomy (Sub Signal 1996)
 GAUDI Gaudium magnum (Polygram/Mercury Records 1993)
 LELE GAUDI Basta Poco (Polygram/Mercury Records 1991)

Singles and EPs
 GAUDI  "Theremin Tribute to The Smiths" EP (Sub Signal 2022)
 DON LETTS  "Outta Sync" - produced by Gaudi (Cooking Vinyl 2022)
 YOUTH & GAUDI Positive In Dub (VP Records 2022)
 YOUTH & GAUDI  "Dropping The Pressure" (Liquid Sound Design 2021)
 GAUDI & GROUCH "Distance" - The Orb remix / Mollono Bass remix (Iboga Records 2021)
 PARANOISE 7in vinyl "Noizu / The 2nd Act" (Skank Bloc Records 2021)
 GAUDI + DUB PISTOLS + DUBMATIX 7in vinyl "Blue Monday / Blue Monday (Gaudi Dub Mix)" (Cyclone Records 2021)
 GAUDI 7in vinyl "Theremin In Hand / Theremin Memoir" (Dubmission Records 2020)
 YOUTH & GAUDI 12in turquoise vinyl EP "Astronaut Alchemist remixes" (Liquid Sound Design 2020)
 LAB DUB Ennio Morricone IN DUB - The Good, The Dub and The Ugly (Lab Dub Records 2019)
 YOUTH & GAUDI 10in green vinyl EP" 2063 : A Dub Odyssey (Liquid Sound Design 2017)
 GAUDI  "10in white vinyl EP" (RareNoiseRecords 2016)
 GAUDI  "Bad Boy Bass Remixes EP" (Six Degrees Records 2010)
 GAUDI + NUSRAT FATEH ALI KHAN "Dub Qawwali Remixed" (Six Degrees Records 2009)
 GAUDI  "The Remixes" (Interchill 2008)
 GAUDI  "Sufani" (Absolutely Records 2004)
 GAUDI  "Desert" (Bustin'Loose 2000)
 MAD MASTER MOOG "Cadillac kitsch" (Tube Trax 1999)
 DUB ALCHEMIST "Retrospective" (Irma Records 1996)
 LOS ANGELS "I want to break free" (Zac 1995)
 LAINZ MEET GAUDI "Vinile" (Black note 1994)
 GAUDI: "Andavo a 100 all'ora" (Polygram 1993)
 GAUDI "Magari" (Polygram/Mercury Records 1992)
 GAUDI "1990 anni fa" (Polygram/Mercury Records 1991)
 TOSSE "Legala" (Vox Pop 1991)
 GAUDI "Malinconico love" (Polygram/Mercury Records 1991)
 ASEO "Ghe Sboro" 7in (Srazz records 1991)
 NATIONAL RARE GROOVE "Talking to you" (Calypso 1990)
 NATIONAL RARE GROOVE "Let's dance" (Calypso 1989)
 4T THIEVES "Etnotechno" (Irma records 1989)
 DR.MUFF & CRAZY STUFF "Don't forget this" (Mighty Quinn 1989)
 RAPTUS "Peggio Della Colla"'' (Multimedia Attack Punk Records 1986)

Gaudi Remixes

Productions and projects

References

External links
 Gaudi's official website
 Gaudi's discography at Discogs

1963 births
Living people
Italian record producers
Italian expatriates in England
Musicians from Bologna
RareNoiseRecords artists
Mercury Records artists
Six Degrees Records artists